Almonaster or Almonester may refer to:
 Almonaster la Real, town in Spain
 Don Andres Almonaster y Rojas
 Micaela Almonester, Baroness de Pontalba
 Almonaster Avenue, in New Orleans, Louisiana, U.S.
 Almonaster Avenue Bridge